T1 was a seagoing torpedo boat that was operated by the Royal Yugoslav Navy between 1921 and 1941. Originally 76 T, a 250t-class torpedo boat of the Austro-Hungarian Navy built in 1914, she was armed with two  guns and four  torpedo tubes, and could carry 10–12 naval mines. She saw active service during World War I, performing convoy, escort and minesweeping tasks, anti-submarine operations and shore bombardment missions. She was part of the escort force for the Austro-Hungarian dreadnought SMS Szent István during the action that resulted in the sinking of that ship by Italian torpedo boats in June 1918. Following Austria-Hungary's defeat later that year, 76 T was allocated to the Navy of the Kingdom of Serbs, Croats and Slovenes, which became the Royal Yugoslav Navy, and was renamed T1. At the time, she and seven other 250t-class boats were the only modern sea-going vessels of the fledgling maritime force.

During the interwar period, T7 and the rest of the navy were involved in training exercises and cruises to friendly ports, but activity was limited by reduced naval budgets. This ship was captured by the Italians during the German-led Axis invasion of Yugoslavia in April 1941. After her main armament was modernised, she served with the Royal Italian Navy under her Yugoslav designation. Following the Italian capitulation in September 1943, she was returned to the Royal Yugoslav Navy-in-exile. She was commissioned by the Yugoslav Navy after World War II, and after a refit which included replacement of her armament, she served as Golešnica until 1959.

Background
In 1910, the Austria-Hungary Naval Technical Committee initiated the design and development of a  coastal torpedo boat, specifying that it should be capable of sustaining  for 10 hours. This specification was based an expectation that the Strait of Otranto, where the Adriatic Sea meets the Ionian Sea, would be blockaded by hostile forces during a future conflict. In such circumstances, there would be a need for a torpedo boat that could sail from the Austro-Hungarian Navy base at the Bocche di Cattaro (Bay of Kotor) to the Strait during darkness, locate and attack blockading ships and return to port before morning. Steam turbine power was selected for propulsion, as diesels with the necessary power were not available, and the Austro-Hungarian Navy did not have the practical experience to run turbo-electric boats. Stabilimento Tecnico Triestino (STT) of Triest was selected for the contract to build eight vessels, ahead of one other tenderer. The T-group designation signified that they were built at Triest.

Description and construction
The crew consisted of 39 officers and enlisted men. The boats were powered by two Parsons steam turbines driving two propellers, using steam generated by two Yarrow water-tube boilers, one of which burned fuel oil and the other coal. The T-group had one funnel rather than the two funnels of the later groups of the class. Due to inadequate funding, 76 T and the rest of the 250t class were essentially coastal vessels, despite the original intention that they would be used for "high seas" operations. They were the first small Austro-Hungarian Navy boats to use turbines, and this contributed to ongoing problems with them.

The boats were originally to be armed with three Škoda  L/30 guns, and three  torpedo tubes, but this was changed to two guns and four torpedo tubes before the first boat was completed, in order to standardise the armament with the following F-group. They could also carry 10–12 naval mines.

The third of its class to be completed, 76 T was laid down on 24 June 1913, launched on 15 December 1913 and completed on 20 July 1914. Later that year, one  machine gun was added.

Career

World War I
At the outbreak of World War I, 76 T was part of the 1st Torpedo Group of the 3rd Torpedo Craft Division of the Austro-Hungarian 1st Torpedo Craft Flotilla. During the war, 76 T was used for convoy, escort and minesweeping tasks, anti-submarine operations, and shore bombardment missions. She also conducted patrols and supported seaplane raids against the Italian coast. On 24 May 1915, 76 T and seven other 250t-class boats were involved in the shelling of various Italian shore-based targets known as the Bombardment of Ancona, with 76 T involved in the operation against Ancona itself. In late November 1915, the Austro-Hungarian fleet deployed a force from its main fleet base at Pola to Cattaro in the southern Adriatic; this force included six of the eight T-group torpedo boats, so it is possible that one of these was 76 T. This force was tasked to maintain a permanent patrol of the Albanian coastline and interdict any troop transports crossing from Italy.

On 3 May 1916, 76 T and five other 250t-class boats were accompanying four destroyers when they were involved in a surface action off Porto Corsini, near Ravenna, against an Italian force led by the flotilla leaders Cesare Rossarol and Guglielmo Pepe. In 1917, one of her 66 mm guns was placed on an anti-aircraft mount. By 1918, the Allies had strengthened their ongoing blockade on the Strait of Otranto, as foreseen by the Austro-Hungarian Navy. As a result, it was becoming more difficult for the German and Austro-Hungarian U-boats to get through the strait and into the Mediterranean Sea. In response to these blockades, the new commander of the Austro-Hungarian Navy, Konteradmiral Miklós Horthy, decided to launch an attack on the Allied defenders with battleships, scout cruisers, and destroyers.

About 03:15 on 10 June, while returning from an uneventful patrol off the Dalmatian coast, two Italian Navy MAS boats, MAS 15 and MAS 21, spotted the smoke from the Austrian ships. Both boats successfully penetrated the escort screen and split to engage the dreadnoughts individually. MAS 21 attacked Tegetthoff, but her torpedoes missed. Under the command of Luigi Rizzo, MAS 15 fired two torpedoes at 03:25, both of which hit Szent István. Both boats evaded pursuit although Rizzo had to discourage 76 T by dropping depth charges in his wake. The torpedo hits on Szent István were abreast her boiler rooms, which flooded, knocking out power to the pumps. Szent István capsized less than three hours after being torpedoed.

Interwar period
76 T survived the war intact. In 1920, under the terms of the previous year's Treaty of Saint-Germain-en-Laye, by which rump Austria officially ended World War I, she was allocated to the Kingdom of Serbs, Croats and Slovenes (KSCS, later Yugoslavia). Along with three other 250t-class T-group boats, 77 T, 78 T and 79 T, and four 250t-class F-group boats, she served with the Royal Yugoslav Navy (KJRM; Краљевска Југословенска Ратна Морнарица). Taken over in March 1921, in KJRM service, 76 T was renamed T1. When the navy was formed, she and the other seven 250t-class boats were the only modern sea-going vessels in the KJRM. In 1925, exercises were conducted off the Dalmatian coast, involving the majority of the navy. It is not clear if T1 was one of the torpedo boats involved. The ships and crews made a very good impression while visiting Malta. In 1932, the British naval attaché reported that Yugoslav ships engaged in few exercises, manoeuvres or gunnery training due to reduced budgets.

World War II and post-war service
In April 1941, Yugoslavia entered World War II when it was invaded by the German-led Axis powers. At the time of the invasion, T1 was assigned to the Southern Sector of the KJRM's Coastal Defence Command based at the Bay of Kotor, along with her sister ship T3 and a number of minesweepers and other craft. T1 was part of the 3rd Torpedo Division, but was left at Kotor when the rest of the division was deployed to the central Dalmatian port of Šibenik just prior to the invasion, in accordance with a plan to attack the Italian enclave of Zara in northern Dalmatia. T1 was captured by the Italian Navy shortly after the commencement of hostilities and was operated by them under her Yugoslav designation, conducting coastal and second-line escort duties in the Adriatic. Her guns were also replaced by two  L/40 anti-aircraft guns. She was allocated to Maridalmazia, the military maritime command of Dalmatia, which was responsible for the area from the northern Adriatic island of Premuda south to the port of Bar in the Italian governorate of Montenegro. On 21 January 1943, T1 was escorting the steamer Cassala near Cape Menders (current day Cape Mendra near Ulcinj, Montenegro, then part of the Italian protectorate of Albania) when they were attacked by the British submarine . Tigris fired four torpedoes but missed both ships.

After the Italians capitulated in September 1943, she was returned by them to the KJRM-in-exile in December 1943. She was commissioned by the Yugoslav Navy (Југословенска Pатна Mорнарица) after the war, serving as Golešnica. Her post-war fit-out included replacing her guns with two  guns on single mounts and four  guns, and removing her torpedo tubes. She continued in Yugoslav service until October 1959, when she was stricken.

See also
 List of ships of the Royal Yugoslav Navy
 List of ships of the Yugoslav Navy

Notes

Footnotes

References

 
 
 
 
 
 
 
 
 
 
 
 
 
 
 
 
 

Torpedo boats of the Austro-Hungarian Navy
Torpedo boats of the Royal Yugoslav Navy
World War I torpedo boats of Austria-Hungary
World War II naval ships of Yugoslavia
Naval ships of Yugoslavia captured by Italy during World War II
1913 ships
Ships built in Trieste